Boris Solomonovitch Schnaiderman (Russian Борис Соломонович Шнайдерман; 17 May 1917 – 18 May 2016) was a Brazilian translator, writer and essayist.

Born in Uman, Ukraine, in 1917, he went to Odessa when he was barely more than one year old, living there until he was 8, when he came to Brazil. He was the first teacher of Russian literature of University of São Paulo, in 1960, despite being graduated in agronomy. He translated renowned Russian writers and poets, like Dostoevsky, Tolstoy, Chekhov, Gorky, Babel, Pasternak, Pushkin and Mayakovsky.

When he was eight years old, before leaving the USSR, he witnessed the filming of the Odessa Steps sequence in Sergey Eisenstein's film The Battleship Potemkin. Schnaiderman only later realised what he had seen when he saw the film in the cinema.

He became a naturalized citizen of Brazil in 1941 and fought in World War II with the Brazilian Expeditionary Force, an experience that inspired him to write the romance Guerra em Surdina ("Muted War"). Due to the way that the Russian culture was seen in the period of military dictatorship in Brazil, his positions against the repression and his Soviet passport, he was later arrested while he was lecturing.

In 2003 he received the Prize of Translation by the Academia Brasileira de Letras. He was the first person who translated to Portuguese classical Russian books directly from the Russian language; before this, indirect translations which decharacterized them were very common. In 2007 he also received the Medal of Pushkin from the Russian government.

Schnaiderman said of Dostoevsky that he was "...the kind of writer who drags us; while we have to agree with him, we have to turn against him. I mean, sometimes I translate something that contradicts my deepest convictions. Dostoevsky was a great writer, he had that understanding, that extraordinary humanity, while he was racist, chauvinistic, sexist."

References

20th-century translators
1917 births
2016 deaths
Brazilian Jews
Brazilian people of Ukrainian-Jewish descent
Brazilian translators
Recipients of Russian civil awards and decorations
Russian–Portuguese translators
Soviet emigrants to Brazil
Translators to Portuguese
Ukrainian Jews